Ganoderma philippii is a plant pathogen infecting cacao, tea and coffee trees.

References

Fungal plant pathogens and diseases
Cacao diseases
Coffee diseases
Tea diseases
Ganodermataceae
Fungi described in 1891